Cornuproetus is a genus of trilobite in the family Tropidocoryphidae.

References

Proetida genera
Extinct animals of Europe
Paleozoic life of Nunavut